The 2010 Russian Figure Skating Championships was held from 23 to 27 December 2009 at the Yubileyny Sports Palace in Saint Petersburg. Skaters competed at the senior level in the disciplines of men's singles, ladies' singles, pair skating, and ice dancing. The junior championships was held separately.

The event was used to help determine the teams for the 2010 Winter Olympics, the 2010 World Championships, and the 2010 European Championships.

Competitions

Medalists of most important competitions

Senior results

Men

Ladies

Pairs

Ice dancing

 Jana Khoklova / Sergei Novitski did not compete here but were placed on the European, Olympic, and World team because of their status as Russian Champions of the previous two years.

Junior results
The 2010 Russian Junior Figure Skating Championships were held between February 3 and 6, 2010 in Saransk. The results were used to choose the teams to the 2010 World Junior Championships.

Men

Ladies

Pairs

Ice dancing

International team selections

Winter Olympic

World Championships

European Championships

World Junior Championships

References

External links
 Official site
 Official calendar at Figure Skating Federation of Russia
 2010 Russian Figure Skating Championships senior results
 2010 Russian Figure Skating Championships junior results

Russian Figure Skating Championships
Russian Figure Skating Championships
Figure Skating Championships
Russian Figure Skating Championships
Figure Skating Championships